Songs of Unreason is a collection of poems by American writer Jim Harrison published in 2011 by Copper Canyon Press.  It was Harrison's thirteenth and penultimate collection. Sixty-seven poems make up the collection, including "Suite of Unreason", a poem of over 350 lines, and a sequence of seven poems relating to rivers (River I - VII). Many of the poems are concerned with the transcendent natural world.

The collection won the High Plains Book Award for Poetry in 2012.

Themes

Dogs and birds 
Non-human creatures, especially dogs and birds, figure prominently in the poems. For example, in Mary the Drug Addict (a poem about a dog named Mary), the poet speaks of the ability to communicate with his dog.

In the poem "Prado," which references dogs, birds and fish, the poet talks about the healing power of a relationship with animals:

In "Chatter," the poet discusses his non-human nature:

Death 
A number of poems evaluate death: how we think about it, how we remember it, how it affects us.  For example, in “Sister,” Harrison remembers a sister who died long ago:

In "River IV" the poet considers aging and death:

The final poem "Death Again" tells us:

Poems 
Consisting of sixty-seven short stanzas and over three hundred lines, "Suite of Unreason" is the longest poem in the collection.  In the first edition, the stanzas of this poem are individually printed on unnumbered left hand pages opposite longer, stand alone poems on facing right hand pages.

Harrison prefaced the poem as follows: "Nearly all my life I’ve noted that some of my thinking was atavistic, primitive, totemic. This can be disturbing to one fairly learned. In this suite I wanted to examine this phenomenon."

The poem can be read as a series of short, haiku-like, meditations.  The first stanza of the poem is a good example:

List 
The poems are numbered in the order they appear in the first edition of the collection.

Poems appearing elsewhere 
 "Blue" and "René Char II" (named after the French poet René Char) were included in New Poets of the American West.
 "A Puzzle", "She", and "Love"  appeared in the Fall 2010 issue of the literary magazine Narrative.
"Suite of Unreason" appeared in the Spring 2011 issue of Narrative.
 "Sunlight" published in the Fall 2011 issue of Reflections (Yale Divinity  School).
 "American Sermon" appeared in the Spring 2017 issue of Reflections (Yale Divinity  School).

References

External links 
 Copper Canyon Press entry for Songs of Unreason
 Suit of Unreason in the magazine Narrative (requires login to read full text).
 "She", "A Puzzle", and "Love" in the magazine Narrative (requires login to read full text).
 "American Sermon" in the periodical Reflections (Yale Divinity School).
 "Sunlight" in the periodical Reflections (Yale Divinity School).

2011 poetry books
American poetry collections
Copper Canyon Press books